There are two feature films based on the manga and anime series Yu Yu Hakusho by Yoshihiro Togashi. The films were produced by Studio Pierrot and released in Japan theatrically, the first Yu Yu Hakusho: The Movie in 1993 and the second Yu Yu Hakusho the Movie: Poltergeist Report in 1994. Before Funimation Entertainment acquired the rights to the anime in 2001, the films were dubbed and released in North America by two other companies. The first by Anime Works and the second by US Manga Corps, both released in 1998. However, the first film and the OVAs (Eizou Hakusho I and II) have since been acquired by Funimation and they produced a new English dub of the film using their original cast from the anime. These were released together as Yu Yu Hakusho: The Movie & Eizou Hakusho on December 13, 2011.

Yu Yu Hakusho: The Movie

Yu Yu Hakusho: The Movie, also known as The Golden Seal, is a 30-minute film that was released theatrically in Japan on July 10, 1993 at the seasonal Toei Anime Fair. The movie was directed by Noriyuki Abe. The movie was English dubbed by Anime Works and Animaze and released on VHS on June 9, 1998 and on a single DVD with Ninku: The Movie on January 30, 2001. Funimation Entertainment later released the film to DVD, along with the Eizou Hakusho OVAs, on December 13, 2011 as Yu Yu Hakusho: The Movie & Eizou Hakusho, featuring a new English dub with their original voice cast from the anime.

Like the television series, it features the songs "Smile Bomb" and "Sayonara Bye Bye" by Matsuko Mawatari (Sarah White and Stephanie Nadolny in the FUNimation English version) for its opening and closing credits respectively.

Plot
While vacationing, Koenma is kidnapped by a pair of demons known as Koashura and Garuga, who demand the possession of Lord Enma's coveted "Golden Seal". Botan finds Yusuke Urameshi and Kazuma Kuwabara on their summer vacation as well, and asks for their assistance in Koenma's rescue.

Voice cast

Reception
According to Martin Ouelette of Protoculture Addicts, the movie did little to satisfy fans of the YuYu Hakusho series during its original release due to its short running time. Reviewing the Funimation release, Carl Kimlinger of Anime News Network gave the subtitled version a "B+", the English dub a straight "B", and called the story disposable stating the film is more focused on "having fun with its theatrical budget".

Yu Yu Hakusho the Movie: Poltergeist Report

The 95 minutes long film was released in theaters in Japan on April 9, 1994. The film was later dubbed into English by Central Park Media and Skypilot Entertainment and was released on VHS on March 3, 1998 and DVD on October 8, 2002. A DVD reprint was later issued by Central Park Media on January 31, 2006. The film was later released on Blu-ray as a part of the Yu Yu Hakusho: 25th Anniversary Box collection on July 27, 2018.

The film features the ending theme "Sayonara wa Iwanai" composed by JILL and sung by Personz.

Plot
The story begins in the Spirit World, where the River Styx is overflowing, due to a tsunami. As this is no ordinary storm, Koenma gives a mysterious item to Botan, and tells her to give it to Yusuke Urameshi, but Botan gets hurt badly and hides it instead. The storm was apparently caused by the forces of the Netherworld, which was banished into cold space ages ago by Lord Enma. To restore balance in the now flooded Spirit World and with Hinegashi's guidance, Yusuke and the others must track down five spots on Earth that contain a large amount of spiritual energy. However, their mission is thwarted when the ruler of the Netherworld, Yakumo and his three demon gods decide to use the same energy to restore their place on Earth. The race begins to save the Spirit World, and now the Human World as well.

Voice cast

Reception
Reviewing the 2002 DVD release, Allen Divers of Anime News Network gave the subtitled version a "B" and the dubbed version a "C". He noted that the film has all the action, drama and comedy that makes the TV series great, but with higher animation and artwork due to a theatrical budget. Divers stated that the dub was well-done and close to the original Japanese, but said it was disappointing that a different English voice cast from the TV series was used. The VHS version was the 31st-best selling video during its release week in North America. It fell to number 37 the following week and rose to number 34 the third week.

References

External links

films
Yu Yu Hakusho: The Movie
Yu Yu Hakusho: The Movie
Anime films based on manga
Funimation
Medialink
Yu Yu Hakusho the Movie: Poltergeist Report
Pierrot (company)